All I Desire is a 1953 American drama romance film directed by Douglas Sirk and starring Barbara Stanwyck, Richard Carlson, Lyle Bettger, Marcia Henderson, Lori Nelson, and Maureen O'Sullivan.  It is based on Carol Ryrie Brink's 1951 novel Stopover.

Plot
In about 1910, Naomi Murdoch, who has not been back to see her husband or children in the small town of Riverdale, Wisconsin, since she abandoned them at the turn of the twentieth century to become a stage actress, is struggling near the bottom of the bill in a traveling vaudeville show. One day, she receives a letter from her daughter Lily, inviting her to come home to attend Lily's acting debut in the high school senior play. A fellow vaudeville actress convinces Naomi that she should return to her family and pretend to be the successful international stage actress she told them she has become.

Naomi's arrival in Riverdale does not go unnoticed, and Clem, the town gossip, starts spreading the word. The first person he tells is Dutch Heinemann, the owner of the hunting and fishing store, whose growing relationship with Naomi was part of the reason she left.

When she gets to her family's home, Naomi is greeted enthusiastically by Lily, but her eldest daughter, Joyce, who has taken on the role of running the household, is bitter about her mother's long absence. Her youngest child, Ted, who is friendly with Dutch, does not remember her. Henry, Naomi's husband and the principal at Lily's school, is unsure how he feels about Naomi being back, particularly because any controversy could threaten his impending promotion to superintendent and he is in a fledgling relationship with Sara Harper, the drama teacher at the high school.

Lily performs to a full house, though most of the townspeople have come to gawk at Naomi, rather than to see the play. Naomi had planned to leave on the late train, but, during the party after the performance, Lily moves the hands back on the clock, so she misses it. Lily invites Naomi to stay until her graduation, and Henry agrees, his feelings for Naomi beginning to resurface. Dutch waits for Lily, in vain, outside the Murdoch house.

The following morning, Naomi goes horseback riding with Joyce and Russ Underwood, Joyce's fiancé. They stop at a spot by a lake where Naomi and Dutch used to have their trysts, and Naomi tells Joyce and Russ to go on without her. Dutch, thinking she did this expecting to see him, approaches Naomi, but she rebuffs him and tells him that she still does not want to cause a scandal for her family. He is not deterred and says he expects to rendezvous with Naomi before she leaves the next day.

At home, Sara, who has seen that Henry still has feelings for Naomi, asks Naomi to do a recitation at the graduation as a way to help revive Naomi's reputation in the town. Joyce enters and tells Naomi the main reason she has been cold to her mother is that Naomi's return has been hard on Henry, and they agree Naomi should leave right away. However, when Naomi tells this plan to Henry, the two talk and reconcile, much to the chagrin of Lily, who had hoped to travel with Naomi and have her use her (nonexistent) connections to establish the girl in the theatrical community.

Dutch sends his special signal to Naomi the morning of the graduation, and she goes to meet him at their spot by the lake. She tells him to leave her alone, but he does not believe she no longer has feelings for him and tries to force himself on her. They struggle and Naomi accidentally shoots Dutch with his rifle. Ted happens by and helps Naomi take Dutch to Dr. Tomlin, the town doctor. He says he thinks Dutch will live, but suggests Naomi go away again to help spare her family's reputation. Lily wants to come with her, so Naomi finally confesses that her career has actually been a total failure.

Henry visits Dutch and is reassured, after seeing his wounds and anger, that Naomi wants nothing more to do with him. He encourages Joyce to let go of her anger towards her mother and, skipping the graduation, goes home to prevent Naomi from leaving. He asks her to forgive him for driving her away ten years earlier and they kiss.

Cast

 Barbara Stanwyck as Naomi Murdoch
 Richard Carlson as Henry Murdoch
 Lyle Bettger as Dutch Heinemann
 Marcia Henderson as Joyce Murdoch
 Lori Nelson as Lily Murdoch
 Maureen O'Sullivan as Sara Harper
 Richard Long as Russ Underwood
 Billy Gray as Ted Murdoch
 Dayton Lummis as Col. Underwood
 Lotte Stein as Lena Maria Svenson
 Fred Nurney as Hans Peterson

Uncredited
 Guy Wilkerson as Clem
 Thomas Jackson as Dr. Philip Tomlin
 Virginia Brissac as Mrs. Tomlin
 Brett Halsey as Chuck, Lily's classmate (John Lexington in the play)
 Stuart Whitman as Lily's classmate (Lord Richard "Dick" Bakersfield in the play)
 Henry Blair as Philip, Lily's classmate (who is "going to be a freshman at Yale")

Reception
The film has received critical acclaim from modern day critics. The review aggregator Rotten Tomatoes reports that 100% of critics gave the film a positive review based on 6 reviews, with an average score of 7.2/10.

Production notes
Douglas Sirk originally shot a darker, sadder ending, but the producer, Ross Hunter, substituted a happier one.

Hunter said Barbara Stanwyck worked for "little or no salary" and the $460,000 budget included 25% studio overhead. He also said the film "was when he learned how to put the money on screen" as a producer.

Richard Long, who has a horseback-riding scene with Stanwyck in the film, would later play her eldest son in all 122 episodes of the TV western series The Big Valley (1965-9).

References

External links
 
 
 

1953 films
1953 romantic drama films
American romantic drama films
American black-and-white films
Films based on American novels
Films directed by Douglas Sirk
Films produced by Ross Hunter
Films scored by Henry Mancini
Films scored by Herman Stein
Universal Pictures films
1950s English-language films
1950s American films